Stree  is a 1968 Oriya film directed by "Siddhartha", which is a pseudonym for Gour Prasad Ghose, Parbati Ghose, & Ram Chandra Thakur.

Synopsis
One day Anuaradha and her brother, a medical doctor, find a young man, Debabrata, unconsciousness in the tides by the sea shore and bring him home. With treatment by her brother and her care, Debabrata gets well.  Anuradha and Debabrata fall in love.  Her brother, Prasanna, gets them married and sees off the couple to Debarata's home.  Upo arriving  Anuradha discovers Debabrata is actually a widower and has a son.  She feels betrayed but as a devoted loving wife overcomes the feeling and gets along with all of Debabrata's family members in the big house.  Gradually she gets close to Debrabrata too and takes care of his son as her own.  Debabrata's sister Bhanu can't accept Anuradha and creates misunderstanding between wife and husband. At last biased Debabrata leaves the house with his son leaving his wife Anuradha behind.  But Anuradha doesn't lose hope.  With her determination, sacrifice and devotion, they reunite in the end.

Cast
 Gour Prasad Ghose - Debabrata
 Parbati Ghose - Anuradha
 Jadunath Das Mahapatra
 Anima Pedini - Mother
 Leela Dulali - Bhanu
 Dinabandhu Das
 Shyamalendu Bhatacharjee
 Sujata Anand
 Sekhar Bose
 Gokulananda Parida 	
 Kunjanada Sahu

Soundtrack
The music for the film is composed by Bhubanseswar Misra.

Trivia
The film's director, music composer and heroine have pseudonym names.

Box office
The film was made on a budget of INR 1,87,000.00. The film was declared as  a box office hit.

Awards
National Film Awards1968
 President's Silver medal for Best Odia film.

References

External links

1968 films
1960s Odia-language films